I Had Seen Castles is a 1993 novella for young adults by the American writer and Newbery Medalist Cynthia Rylant.

Plot summary
It is a story about a young American named John Dante who enthusiastically enlists in 1942 but soon comes to understand the horrors of war.

It can be deemed as an anti-war novel due to Rylants way of describing the War and its consequences.

Reviews
"The volume is deceptively slim; this finely drawn novel projects emotional truths to rival those of Remarque's All Quiet on the Western Front."

References

1993 American novels
American young adult novels
Novels set during World War II
Novels set in Pittsburgh
American novellas